Tišina is a town in the Prekmurje region of northeastern Slovenia. It is the seat of the Municipality of Tišina. The parish church in the settlement is dedicated to the Nativity of Mary and belongs to the Roman Catholic Diocese of Murska Sobota. It dates to the 12th century with extensive 16th-century rebuilding.

Notable people 
 Ferenc Ivanóczy (1857–1913), Slovene priest and politician in Hungary
 Simon Špilak (born 1986), cyclist

References

External links
 Tišina at Geopedia
 

Populated places in the Municipality of Tišina